The 1965 Gillette Cup was the third Gillette Cup, an English limited overs county cricket tournament. It was held between 23 April and 4 September 1965. The tournament was won by Yorkshire, following Geoff Boycott's 146 runs in the final at Lord's. Boycott's innings remained the highest ever scored in a Lord's county limited-overs final. until 2017.

Format
The seventeen first-class counties, were joined by five Minor Counties: Berkshire, Buckinghamshire, Cambridgeshire, Norfolk and Wiltshire. Teams who won in the first round progressed to the second round. The winners in the second round then progressed to the quarter-final stage. Winners from the quarter-finals then progressed to the semi-finals from which the winners then went on to the final at Lord's which was held on 4 September 1965.

First round

Second round

Quarter-finals

Semi-finals

Final

References

External links 
CricketArchive tournament page 

Friends Provident Trophy seasons
Gillette Cup, 1965